John Cunningham (born 3 March 1952) is an English former professional rugby league footballer who played in the 1970s and 1980s.

Background
John Cunningham was born in Barrow-in-Furness, Lancashire, England.

Playing career

International honours
John Cunningham won caps for England while at Barrow in 1975 against France, and Wales.

County honours
John Cunningham represented Cumbria.

BBC2 Floodlit Trophy Final appearances
John Cunningham played right-, i.e. number 10, in Hull Kingston Rovers' 26–11 victory over St. Helens in the 1977–78 BBC2 Floodlit Trophy Final at Craven Park, Hull on Tuesday 13 December 1977.

Notable tour matches
John Cunningham made his début, and scored a try in Barrow's 10–14 defeat by New Zealand at Craven Park on Wednesday 4 November 1970.

Club career
John Cunningham joined Barrow in July 1970, his last match for Barrow was against Huddersfield at Craven Park on Friday 14 March 1975, he was transferred from Barrow to Hull Kingston Rovers for £6,000 on 17 July 1975 (based on increases in average earnings, this would be approximately £64,780 in 2013), he suffered several knee injuries that limited his appearances for Hull Kingston Rovers, he was transferred from Hull Kingston Rovers to Workington Town for £18,000 in 1980 (based on increases in average earnings, this would be approximately £98,020 in 2013).

Genealogical information
John Cunningham is married to Julie, and is the uncle of the rugby league footballers, Liam Harrison and Ben Harrison.

Outside of rugby league
John Cunningham has been the landlord of; The Derby Hotel, 246–248 Dalton Road, Barrow-In-Furness; The Furness Hotel, 13 Bath St, Barrow-In-Furness which is now named Cunningham's after him; and The Old Bank, 107–109 Duke Street, Barrow-In-Furness.

References

External links
(archived by web.archive.org) Trio Inducted Into Barrow RL Hall Of Fame
(archived by web.archive.org) Profile at barrowrlfc.com

1952 births
Living people
Balmain Tigers players
Barrow Raiders players
Cumberland rugby league team players
Cumbria rugby league team players
England national rugby league team players
English rugby league players
Hull Kingston Rovers players
Publicans
Rugby league players from Barrow-in-Furness
Rugby league props
Rugby league second-rows
Workington Town players